Eagle Lake is a backcountry lake in the Sierra Nevada mountain range, to the west of Lake Tahoe in the Desolation Wilderness. It can be reached by hiking west out of the Eagle Lake trailhead on HWY 89 at Emerald Bay State Park.

See also
 List of lakes in California

External links

 Pictures from the Desolation Area, especially near Eagle Lake

Lakes of the Desolation Wilderness
Lakes of the Sierra Nevada (United States)
Lakes of El Dorado County, California
Lakes of California
Lakes of Northern California